Alejandro Viniegra Santana (born 13 February 2002) is a Brazilian professional footballer who plays as a midfielder for Bragantino.

Club career

Cruzeiro
Viniegra made his professional debut with Cruzeiro on 12 February 2018 playing the last minute against  Bahia ending in a tie.

International career

Mexico
In October 2020, Viniegra was called up to the Mexico national under-20 team training camp by Raúl Chabrand, for which he had done virtual training sessions three months before.

Personal life
Born in Brazil to a Mexican father and a Brazilian mother, he holds dual Brazilian and Mexican citizenship.

Notes

References

External links

 
 

2002 births
Living people
Mexican footballers
People from Ribeirão Preto
Mexico youth international footballers
Brazilian footballers
Brazil youth international footballers
Mexican people of Brazilian descent
Brazilian people of Mexican descent
Association football midfielders
Cruzeiro Esporte Clube players
Red Bull Brasil players
Campeonato Brasileiro Série A players
Brazilian expatriate footballers
Mexican expatriate footballers
North Texas SC players
Footballers from São Paulo (state)